Leines is a small village in the municipality of Steigen in Nordland county, Norway. The villages of Leinesfjord and Sørskot are located a few kilometres across the fjord on the opposite shore. Leiranger Church is located in Leines.

References

Steigen
Villages in Nordland
Populated places of Arctic Norway